Iñaki Malumbres Aldave (born 3 August 1975) was a Navarre handball player who was playing for Spain men's national handball team.

References 

Spanish male handball players
Living people
1975 births
Handball players from Navarre
Expatriate handball players
Spanish expatriate sportspeople in North Macedonia
People from Cuenca de Pamplona